John Fleck (born May 7, 1951) is an American actor and performance artist. He has performed in numerous TV shows, including Babylon 5,  Carnivàle, Murder One, and the Star Trek franchise. He also appeared in Howard The Duck, Waterworld and the music video for the ZZ Top song "Legs". He made a minor appearance in the Seinfeld episode "The Heart Attack". He played a minor character during the sixth season of Weeds. He wrote and performed "Mad Women" at La MaMa E.T.C.

He is also one of the NEA Four. In 1990 he and three of his fellow artists became embroiled in a lawsuit against the government's National Endowment for the Arts program. John Frohnmayer, one of the chairman of the NEA, vetoed funding his project, a performance comedy with a toilet prop, on the basis of content and was accused of implementing a partisan political agenda. The artists won their case in court in 1993 and were awarded amounts equal to the grant money in question, though the case would make its way to the United States Supreme Court in National Endowment for the Arts v. Finley, which ruled in favour of the NEA's decision making process.

Filmography

References

External links
 
 

1951 births
Living people
American gay actors
American performance artists